Ulderico Carpegna (24 June 1595 – 24 January 1679) was an Italian jurist and Cardinal.

Biography
Born at Scavolino, he was from a family of the Roman nobility, connected with the Montefeltro family.

He became bishop of Gubbio in 1630, and cardinal in 1633. He was bishop of Todi from 1638, resigning by 1643. He was Camerlengo for a year from 1648. Consecrated by Luigi Caetani, he became bishop of Albano in 1666, bishop of Frascati in 1671, and bishop of Porto and Santa-Rufina in 1675. He died in Rome. Through his episcopal consecration of Paluzzo Paluzzi Altieri degli Albertoni, he is part of the episcopal lineage of Pope Francis. He is also connected to the lineage of Pope Benedict XVI.

Carpegna was a patron of Francesco Borromini and commissioned the Baroque architect important works of transformation and expansion of his palace at Fontana di Trevi. As a token of gratitude, Borromini named the prelate executor of his will and bequeathed him money and objects of considerable value "for", as he wrote, "the infinite debt I have toward him".

The Fondo Carpegna of the Vatican Secret Archives contains material relating to Ulderico Carpegna and Gaspare Carpegna.

Episcopal succession

References

External links
Page at the Florida University

1595 births
1679 deaths
People from the Province of Rimini
17th-century Italian cardinals
Cardinal-bishops of Albano
Cardinal-bishops of Frascati
Cardinal-bishops of Porto
Cardinals created by Pope Urban VIII
17th-century Italian jurists